A café racer is a genre of sport motorcycles that originated among British motorcycle enthusiasts of the early 1960s in  London. Café racers were standard production bikes that were modified by their owners and optimized for speed and handling for quick rides over short distances. Café racers have since become popular around the world, and some manufacturers produce factory-made models that are available in the showrooms.

Noted for its visual minimalism, a 1960s café racer would typically be an English parallel twin motorcycle with low-mounted clip-on or "Ace" handlebars with rear-set footrests. Items considered "non-essential" such as side panels, rear chain enclosures, and voluminous mudguards (fenders) were replaced by lighter items, or dispensed with altogether.

Café racer origins
Café racers were particularly associated with the urban Rocker or "Ton-Up Boys" youth subculture, where the bikes were used for short, quick rides between popular cafés, such as London's Ace Café on the North Circular ring road, and Watford's Busy Bee café. In post-war Britain, car ownership was still uncommon, but as rationing and austerity diminished, by the late 1950s young men could for the first time afford a motorcycle. Previously, motorcyles (often with voluminous sidecars) provided family transport, but the growing economy enabled such families to afford a car and dispense with a motorcycle at last. Young men were eager to buy such cast-off motorcycles and modify them into café racers, which for them represented speed, status, and rebellion, rather than mere inability to afford a car.

The café racer idea caught on in the US, which was already a major market for British motorcycles. In 2014, journalist Ben Stewart recognised the café racer as a European style that would be appreciated in America. Writing in 1973, Wallace Wyss claimed that the term "café racer" was originally used in Europe to describe a "motorcyclist who played at being an Isle of Man road racer".

Subculture

"Rockers" were a young and rebellious rock and roll subculture who wanted to escape the crushing convention of dreary 1950s UK culture. Owning a fast, personalised, and distinctive café racer gave them status and allowed them to ride between transport cafés in and around British towns and cities. Biker lore has it that one goal was to reach "the ton",, along a route where the rider would leave from a café, race to a predetermined point, and return to the café before a single song could play on the jukebox, called record-racing. However, author Mike Seate contends that record-racing is a myth, the story having originated in an episode of the BBC Dixon of Dock Green television show. Café racers are remembered as being especially fond of rockabilly music and their image is now embedded in today's rockabilly culture.

The café racer subculture has created a separate look and identity with modern café racers taking style elements from  American greasers, British rockers, 70s bikers, and modern motorcycle riders to create a global style of their own.

Café racer configuration

Café racer riders would often lighten their bikes, and tune their engine, typically fitting "clip-ons" (or dropped handlebars) and rear-set footrests, which enabled the rider to "tuck in", reducing wind resistance and improving control. Occasionally, café racers might be fitted with half- or even full-race-style fairings. Some bikes had swept-back pipes,  reverse cone megaphone mufflers, TT100 Dunlop tires,  and larger carburetors (often with inlet trumpet rather than air filters). Occasionally the standard dual seat would be replaced by a solo saddle.

As owners became more experimental, they would fit engines in different frames. A typical example was the "Triton", a homemade combination of a Triumph Bonneville engine in a Norton Featherbed frame. A less common hybrid was the "Tribsa", which had a Triumph engine in a BSA duplex frame. Other hybrids included the "NorVin" (a Vincent V-Twin engine in a Featherbed frame), and bikes with racing frames by Rickman or Seeley.

Evolution

Café-racer styling evolved throughout the time of their popularity. By the mid-1970s, Japanese bikes had overtaken British bikes in the marketplace, and the look of real Grand Prix racing bikes had changed. The hand-made, frequently unpainted aluminium racing fuel tanks of the 1960s had evolved into square, narrow, fibreglass tanks. Increasingly, three-cylinder Kawasaki two-strokes, four-cylinder four-stroke Kawasaki Z1, and four-cylinder Honda engines were the basis for café racer conversions. By 1977, a number of manufacturers had taken notice of the café racer boom and were producing factory café racers, such as the well-received Moto Guzzi Le Mans and the Harley-Davidson XLCR. The Japanese domestic market started making cafe racer replicas in the early 1980s, first Honda with the GB250 in 1983, then GB400 and GB500 versions in 1985. The GB400TTMKII has a frame mounted fairing and single seat with cowl.  The Honda GB500 TT, sought to emulate BSA and Norton café racers of the 1960s. Markets outside got the XBR500 in 1985, with more angular modern styling to compete with the Yamaha SRX600, until Honda USA released a version of the GB500 in 1989.

In the mid-1970s, riders continued to modify standard production motorcycles into so-called "café racers" by simply equipping them with clubman bars and a small fairing around the headlight. A number of European manufacturers, including Benelli, BMW, Bultaco, and Derbi produced factory "café" variants of their standard motorcycles in this manner, without any modifications made to make them faster or more powerful, a trend that continues today.

Although many riders of four-strokes associate cafe racers with four-stroke motors and British marques, and with an era prior to the onslaught of mostly-Japanese two-strokes, owners of two-stroke standard motorcycles have also been as enthusiastic at modifying their motorcycles into cafe racers, although the riders are less likely to ape 1950s clothing and hair fashions. During the course of the 1980s, manufacturers mostly phased out two-stroke standard motorcycles, replacing them with race replicas. Many obsolete standard designs continued to be manufactured or distributed from remaining stocks, especially in less wealthy countries. 1970s Yamaha and Honda designs, by example, were distributed or manufactured in India and elsewhere through partnerships with Indian manufacturers such as Escorts (partnered with Yamaha)  and Hero Cycles (Hero Honda). Owners of these machines in countries where they are still available, such as India, Malaysia, and the Philippines have continued to modify these two-stroke standard motorcycles into cafe racers. Manufacturers of newer two-stroke designs also produce cafe racer inspired models, including the British 250cc Langen cafe racer announced in 2020.

Modern café racers

Major manufacturers, such as BMW, Norton, Ducati and Yamaha, have responded to consumer interest in ready-to-ride café racers and have exploited this niche market. Triumph produced a turn-key retro motorcycle with their Thruxton R. Another modern cafe racer is the Ducati SportClassic, made from 2006 till 2009.

The café racer influence is apparent in the design of some electric motorcycles, for example, the TC model of Super Soco is commonly referred to as a café racer.

Modern stock café racers from motorcycle factories include:

 BMW R nineT Racer
 Ducati Scrambler Café Racer
 Harley-Davidson XL1200CX Roadster
 Métisse Mk5
 Moto Guzzi V7 
 Norton Commando 961 Café Racer
 Royal Enfield Continental GT 650
 Yamaha XSR900 Abarth
 Honda CB1000R Neo-Sports Café Racer
 Triumph Speed Triple (1200 RR)
 Kawasaki Z900RS Cafe

See also
 59 Club
 Ace Cafe London
 Outline of motorcycles and motorcycling

References

Further reading

 
 
 Clay, Mike. (1988) Café Racers: Rockers, Rock 'n' Roll and the Coffee-bar Cult. London: Osprey Publishing. 
 
 D'Orléans, Paul and Lichter, Michael. Café Racers: Speed, Style, and Ton-Up Culture. Motorbooks, 2014 
 
 
  
 
 Walker, Alastair. The Café Racer Phenomenon. 2009 Veloce Publishing

External links 

 Benedict Campbell film on making US version of a Cafe Racer, 10 min.
 How to build a café racer - Bike Exif articles

Custom motorcycles
Sport bikes
Motorcycle customization